Coruche is a former freguesia in Aguiar da Beira Municipality, Guarda District, Portugal. It was merged with Aguiar da Beira in 2013 to form the new freguesia Aguiar da Beira e Coruche. The Portucalense Bridge over the River Coja is located in this former freguesia.

Demography

References

Former parishes of Aguiar da Beira